Rajmani Pandey राजमणि पाण्डेय (born 12 November 1943) is an Indian politician who was a member of 10th Legislative Assembly of Uttar Pradesh. He was elected as MLA from 168, Basti Sadar constituency of District Basti Uttar Pradesh as a candidate of Janta Dal in 1989.[1]

Personal life and education 
He was born in 1943, into a Brahmin family of Rampur Rewati Village of Basti District, India. His father was Divakar Pandey. 

Rajmani Pandey married at the age of 17, in 1960. He has a son, Dr. Ajay Pandey, and a daughter, Saraswati Pandey. 

He completed his schooling at Basti and moved to Gorakhpur University for higher education. He received his B.Ed, MA (Sociology and Political Science), and LLB at Gorakhpur University.  [4].

Political career 
His political career began at Gorakhpur University where he participated in Chatra Andolan, Majdor Andolan, Kisan Andolan. He was president of Gorakhpur University Student Union in 1972-1973. 

He was imprisoned in Basti, Gorakhpur, Gonda, Lucknow, Tihar prisons for a total of 6 years. During the emergency, he was in prison for more than 19 months in Misa. 

He became president and All-India general secretary of Samajwadi Yuva Jan Sabha U.P. and also president of Mandi Samiti, Basti.[4]

He ran in UP Assembly election in 1980 as a candidate of JNP (SR)from Basti constituency and was 3rd in the vote, with 13983 votes.[2]He again participated in the 1985 UP assembly election as a candidate of the LKD from Basti constituency and stood second with 26191 votes.[3]He was elected as MLA of Basti Sadar in 10th Assembly Election of UP in 1989 as candidate of Janta Dal. He defeated Ex-Chief Minister of UP and candidate of Indian National Congress Jagadambika Pal by 22,783 votes getting 52,530 votes.[5]He was MLA of Basti Sadar from December 1989 through April 1991. [7] He joined Samajwadi Party and ran as candidate of Samajwadi party from Basti Sadar in 14th Assembly election in 2007 but lost to the candidate of BSP Jitendra Chaudhary.[8]

References 

Uttar Pradesh politicians